The Mitchell Museum of the American Indian is a museum in Evanston, Illinois that focuses exclusively on the history, culture and arts of North American native peoples. It is a Core Member of the Chicago Cultural Alliance, a consortium of 25 ethnic museums and cultural centres in Chicago.

The Museum's collections range from the Paleo-Indian period through the present day. Permanent exhibitions depict the Native American cultures of the Woodlands, Plains, Southwest, Northwest Coast and Arctic. Two temporary exhibit galleries have special thematic shows that change two times a year.

Permanent Galleries

Woodlands Gallery
The Woodlands Gallery focuses on the native peoples living east of the Mississippi River, including the Northeast, Southeast and Great Lakes areas. A full-size birchbark canoe is the centerpiece of the exhibit with individual cases exploring fishing, hunting and gathering, wood splint and birchbark containers, and various forms of personal ornament, including glass beads, quillwork and moosehair embroidery. A separate case shows the clothing and crafts of the Southeastern Woodlands peoples, including the Seminole, Cherokee and Choctaw tribes, and features a rare late 19th century velvet patchwork Seminole man's Big Shirt. The gallery also includes a model Long House and photographic essays on canoe making and wild rice harvesting.

Plains Gallery
The Plains Gallery explores the lifeways of the Native American tribes living in the central part of North America. Moccasins, blanket strips and a variety of carrying bags show the distinctive beadwork designs typical of the Crow, Cheyenne, Blackfoot and Lakota (Sioux). Dolls, including two made by contemporary Lakota artists Charlene and Rhonda Holy Bear provide detailed examples of men and women's dress. The Plains hunting and warrior traditions are represented by an eagle feather war bonnet, weapons and a shield, as well as a number of carved catlinite pipe bowls.

Southwest Gallery
The Southwest Gallery illustrates the culture and art of the Pueblo, Navajo and southern Arizona Papago and Tohono O'odham (Pima) peoples. Cases are devoted to Pueblo pottery, ranging from thousand year-old Anasazi bowls to contemporary works, including several pieces by the famed San Ildefonso potter Maria Martinez, and the silver and turquoise jewelry of Zuni, Navajo, Hopi and Santo Domingo artists. Over 40 different Kachina dolls including several turn of the century carvings from Acoma and Laguna Pueblos are also on exhibit, as are Navajo rugs from many of the different early 20th century trading posts.

Northwest Coast and Arctic Gallery
The Northwest Coast and Arctic Gallery provides insight into the people living along the Pacific Coast of Washington, Alaska and British Columbia and in the northern reaches of Canada. Prints, baskets, masks and other wooden carvings demonstrate the way Northwest Coast art incorporates family history in its imagery. A full size dance screen, painted by a contemporary Tlingit artist for the Museum, a Button Robe, and a woven goat hair and cedar bark Chilkat blanket are also on view. The wide variety of materials used by the Inuit and Athapascan peoples of the Arctic is shown by the everyday items on exhibit, including several pairs of snow goggles made from caribou hoof, bone and wood. A full-size early 20th century walrus intestine parka from western Alaska and contemporary dolls from Kotzebue and St. Lawrence Island illustrate different types of traditional dress.

Collections
The Mitchell Museum of the American Indian holds over 9,000 objects dating from the Paleo-Indian period through the present day. The collection covers all areas of North America, including the Woodlands, Plains, Plateau, Southwest, Northwest Coast and Arctic peoples. The Museum's areas of strength include:
 Great Lakes ice fishing decoys
 Traditional and contemporary dolls from throughout North America
 19th and 20th century Beadwork from the Northern Plains and Great Lakes regions
 Baskets from the Great Lakes, Southwest, California and Northwest Coast
 Navajo weavings
 Late 19th and early 20th century Kachinas
 Cape Dorset prints
 Arctic stone, ivory and bone carvings dating from prehistoric through modern times

External links
 Mitchell Museum of the American Indian

Native American museums in Illinois
Museums in Evanston, Illinois